SS Betty Zane (MC contract 873) was a Liberty ship built in the United States during World War II. She was named after Betty Zane, a frontier heroine of the American Revolutionary War and ancestor of author Zane Grey.

The ship was laid down by North Carolina Shipbuilding Company in their Cape Fear River yard on November 20, 1942, then launched on December 22, 1942. Zane was operated by the States Marine Corporation for the War Shipping Administration until December 1946 when she entered the National Defense Reserve Fleet at Wilmington, North Carolina.

In November 1943 while in the Mediterranean Sea she was attacked by numerous German aircraft, downing a JU-88. Zane was sold to a Greek firm in December 1946 and renamed Anastassios Pateras.  She was scrapped in 1968

References 

Liberty ships
Ships built in Wilmington, North Carolina
1942 ships